Tanguy Alban Harrys Ngombo, often incorrectly written as Targuy Ngombo (born July 18, 1984 [disputed]), is a Congolese–Qatari professional basketball player who plays for Al Rayyan of the Qatari Basketball League. He has represented the Qatari national team in international competition. He was drafted by the Dallas Mavericks with the 57th pick in the 2011 NBA Draft. His draft rights were subsequently traded to the Portland Trail Blazers and then to the Minnesota Timberwolves. He is the first Qatari national basketball player to be selected in the NBA Draft.

Career
Ngombo has played in Qatar since 2006 after playing for the Inter Club Brazzaville in his home nation of the Congo. In 2011, he helped Al Rayyan win the Qatar Basketball League. He led his team in scoring and rebounds, averaging 20.7 points and 8.9 rebounds per game. He then helped Al-Rayyan finish third in the FIBA Asia Champions Cup while averaging 16.3 points per game.

Ngombo has represented the Qatari national team since 2010. He played in the 2010 FIBA Asia Stanković Cup, helping Qatar win the bronze medal. He played in all 7 games and led the team in scoring in every game with an average of 30.0 points per game. He then played for Qatar in the 2010 Asian Games in Guangzhou, China. He played in all 8 games, averaging 19.6 points per game as Qatar finished in 5th place.

On June 23, 2011, he was drafted by the Dallas Mavericks with the 57th pick in the second round of the 2011 NBA Draft. His draft rights were immediately traded to the Portland Trail Blazers as part of a three-team trade with the Denver Nuggets. The Blazers then traded his rights to the Minnesota Timberwolves in exchange for a future second-round pick. His rights were ultimately removed by Minnesota a month after general manager David Kahn was fired and replaced by Flip Saunders.

Age discrepancy
In 2005, Ngombo, who was still playing with Congolese team Inter Club Brazzaville, was listed as being born on July 18, 1984 in the 2005 FIBA Africa Clubs Champions Cup. A few years later, he was listed as being born in 1989 by FIBA Asia in the 2010 FIBA Asia Champions Cup, the 2010 FIBA Asia Stanković Cup and the 2010 Asian Games. However, in 2011, FIBA published a piece of contradictory information by listing 1984 as Ngombo's birth year on the Qatar roster for the 2011 FIBA Asia Championship.

At the 2011 NBA Draft, he was selected as Targuy Ngombo, who was a soon-to-be 22 year old player born in 1989. After the draft, reports surfaced claiming that Ngombo lied about his name and his birth date and that he was actually born in 1984, which would have made him ineligible for the draft. The NBA rules state that an international player who is over the age of 22 is not eligible for the draft and must be signed as a free agent. Additionally, the use of the name Targuy was a misspelling; he was often listed under that name in several FIBA competitions. His trade to the Timberwolves, which was first reported on the night of the draft, was reportedly being held up for several days because of the age discrepancy. Four days after the draft, the Blazers announced that they had finalized the trade of Ngombo to the Timberwolves, which implies that the NBA approved Ngombo's eligibility for the draft and the subsequent trades.

References

External links
Tanguy Ngombo at NBA.com
Targuy Ngombo Draft 2011 Prospects at NBA.com
When the Timberwolves Passed on Isaiah Thomas to Draft a Mystery Man from Qatar

1989 births
Age controversies
Living people
Basketball players at the 2010 Asian Games
Dallas Mavericks draft picks
Naturalised citizens of Qatar
Qatari men's basketball players
Republic of the Congo men's basketball players
Small forwards
Sportspeople from Brazzaville
Basketball players at the 2018 Asian Games
Asian Games competitors for Qatar
Republic of the Congo expatriate basketball people in the United States
Republic of the Congo expatriate basketball people in Qatar